The Roanoke River runs  long through southern Virginia and northeastern North Carolina in the United States. A major river of the southeastern United States, it drains a largely rural area of the coastal plain from the eastern edge of the Appalachian Mountains southeast across the Piedmont to Albemarle Sound. An important river throughout the history of the United States, it was the site of early settlement in the Virginia Colony and the Carolina Colony. An  section of its lower course in Virginia between the Leesville Lake and Kerr Lake is known as the Staunton River, pronounced , as is the Shenandoah Valley city of that name. It is impounded along much of its middle course to form a chain of reservoirs.

Staunton River is also the name of the northern political district of Pittsylvania County, Virginia, where a large section of the river serves as the boundary between Campbell County, Virginia (to the north) and Pittsylvania County (to the south).

The Roanoke River State Trail is a paddle trail which follows the lower portion of the river, from Roanoke Rapids to the Albemarle Sound.

Description
The river has its headwaters in the Blue Ridge Mountains in southwestern Virginia at Lafayette in Montgomery County where the North Fork and South Fork of the river merge.

The river flows generally east-southeast across the Piedmont of southern Virginia and enters northeastern North Carolina, passing north of Roanoke Rapids at the fall line. The river flows southeast in a zigzag course across the coastal plain through the Roanoke River National Wildlife Refuge and then briefly turns north as it enters Batchelor Bay on the western end Albemarle Sound. The Roanoke River is also known as the Staunton River for 80 miles between Smith Mountain Lake and convergence with the Dan River at Kerr Lake.

The river is impounded in six locations. The first is the Niagara Dam just south of the City of Roanoke in Roanoke County adjacent to the town of Vinton. It was constructed in 1906 to supply power for the Roanoke Electric Car streetcar system, and is currently owned and operated by Appalachian Power. It is then impounded twice in succession in the Piedmont of southwestern Virginia downstream from Roanoke to form the Smith Mountain Lake and Leesville Lake reservoirs. Farther downstream in southern along the North Carolina border, the river is impounded by the John H. Kerr Dam to form the expansive Kerr Lake.

History

The Roanoke River valley was the homeland of various Native Americans, mostly Virginia Siouan, such as the Occaneechi (today part of the Haliwa-Saponi) and the Tutelo.  The name Roanoke is derived from rawrenok, an Algonquian word for wampum. The deadly spring floods earned it the name "River of Death".  The river's lower course began to be settled by Virginians about the middle of the 17th century, in what was known as the Albemarle Settlements. The upper reaches of the Roanoke River were explored by fur trading parties sent by Abraham Wood in the late 17th century, but these were not settled by English until the early 18th century.

In 1883, the small town of Big Lick on the river was selected as a major shops and terminal point for the new Norfolk and Western Railway to meet the Shenandoah Valley Railroad. Big Lick was renamed Roanoke for the river that bisected it, as the surrounding Roanoke County had been in 1838.

The Roanoke River was prone to serious flooding prior to the completion of the John H. Kerr Dam in 1953. Construction of the dam was precipitated by the 1940 South Carolina hurricane, which caused record flooding in the Roanoke River basin and led to calls for better flood control mechanisms.

In 1997, the non-profit Roanoke River Partners formed to create a paddle trail along the river in North Carolina.  The group established a system of river accesses and camping platforms between Roanoke Rapids and the Albemarle Sound, known as the Roanoke River Paddle Trail.

On November 18, 2021, the North Carolina General Assembly passed a law adding the Roanoke River Paddle Trail as its twelfth State Trail.

See also
List of North Carolina rivers
List of Virginia rivers
South Atlantic-Gulf Water Resource Region

References

External links 

Roanoke River Basin Association
Roanoke River Partners

 
Rivers of North Carolina
Rivers of Virginia
Rivers of Montgomery County, Virginia
Rivers of Floyd County, Virginia
Rivers of Roanoke County, Virginia
Rivers of Franklin County, Virginia
Rivers of Bedford County, Virginia
Tributaries of Albemarle Sound
Rivers of Washington County, North Carolina